The National Italo-Romanian Cultural and Economic Movement or National Italo-Romanian Fascist Movement was a short-lived Fascist movement active in Romania during the early 1920s.

The movement was formed in 1921 by Elena Bacaloglu, a female journalist who had an Italian husband at the time, and was an acquaintance of Benito Mussolini (she had been briefly the wife of Ovid Densusianu). The group deliberately mimicked Italian fascism and stressed the close ethnic bonds between the Italians and the Romanians. The group attracted only around 100 members. The group was based in Cluj, where it was initially established. It was wound up in 1923, when it merged with the National Romanian Fascia to form the National Fascist Movement.

References

Defunct political parties in Romania
Fascist parties in Romania
Political parties established in 1921
1923 disestablishments in Romania
Political parties disestablished in 1923
1921 establishments in Romania
Political parties of minorities in Romania